The Dust of Time is a 2008 Greek drama film written and directed by Theodoros Angelopoulos, and starring Willem Dafoe, Irène Jacob, Bruno Ganz, Michel Piccoli and Christiane Paul.

The film is the second of an unfinished trilogy started with Trilogy: The Weeping Meadow in 2004. The final installment, under the working title The Other Sea, was left incomplete due to Angelopoulos' unexpected death in January 2012.

Plot
In 1999, A, an American filmmaker of Greek descent, receives a phone call from his melancholic daughter at the Cinecittà studio. He rushes back to his apartment in Rome, where he finds a letter his mother, Eleni, wrote to his father, Spyros, in 1956.

In 1953, Eleni and Jacob, a Jew of German descent, watch the newsreel in Temirtau. Spyros arrives, and he and Eleni jump onto a tram, ditching Jacob. The tram arrives at the public square in front of the government office, where Stalin's death is publicly announced. That night, following an intimate encounter, Spyros and Eleni are arrested and separated.

In 1956 Siberia, Eleni puts her three-year-old son on the train to Moscow, where Jacob's older sister will take care of him.

On New Year's Eve 1973, Eleni and Jacob cross the border from Hungary to Austria. After celebrating the New Year together, Eleni ends the relationship, encouraging Jacob to go on to Israel.

In summer 1974, Eleni finally finds Spyros in the New York suburbs. However, she leaves without greeting him after realizing that he is already married to another woman.

In winter 1974, Eleni crosses the border from the United States to Canada. There, she and A meet again for the first time in many years. A drives Spyros to an Ontario bar, where Eleni works. Spyros proposes to Eleni, which she accepts.

In 1999, Eleni and Spyros arrive in Berlin. Jacob visits and the three go out to the station. There, Eleni feels dizzy. Spyros phones A and is informed that their granddaughter has been found. Eleni and Spyros go to the old building where their granddaughter barricades herself among addicts and vagabonds. Eleni enters and rescues her granddaughter. They return to A's Berlin apartment, and Eleni lies down in her granddaughter's room. After visiting, Jacob drowns himself in the Spree river.

On New Year's Day 2000, Eleni dies. Spyros and his granddaughter look out of the window. After a while, the two run hand in hand under the snowy Brandenburg Gate.

Cast
 Willem Dafoe as A
 Irène Jacob as Eleni, A's mother
 Michel Piccoli as Spyros
 Bruno Ganz as Jacob
 Christiane Paul as Helga
 Tiziana Pfiffner as Eleni, A's daughter
 Alessia Franchini as A's secretary
 Reni Pittaki as the film composer

Production
The Dust of Time was shot over a four-month period, starting in 2007. Filming took place in Russia, Kazakhstan, Canada, the United States, Germany, Italy, and Greece.

Release
The Dust of Time premiered at the 2008 Thessaloniki International Film Festival. It was shown at the 59th Berlin International Film Festival.

The score by Eleni Karaindrou was released on the ECM label in 2009.

Reception
The Dust of Time received some positive reviews in the Greek press. Peter Brunette of The Hollywood Reporter gave the film a mixed review, stating that the plot had improbable situations and describing the film as "a curious mixture of the brilliant and the absurd." Dan Fainaru of Screen International felt that it is Theodoros Angelopoulos' most affecting and personal film in years. Derek Elley of Variety criticized the film as "a tired-looking attempt to say something significant by a 73-year-old auteur who has neither anything significant left to say nor the cinematic smarts to say it with." Vrasidas Karalis found the film to suffer from overplotting, and viewed its "depictions of intersecting temporalities" as inventive but confusing. In the book Cinema of Theo Angelopoulos, Angelos Koutsourakis wrote that "the expository dialogue [...] often comes across as wooden" and stated that the film had a "bristling recalcitrance".

Ronald Bergan was more positive, writing in The Guardian that "the film sometimes veers from the profound to the portentous, from the sublimely ridiculous to the ridiculously sublime. However, these weaknesses fade beside the strength of the great set pieces [...] and the passion of the narrative."

In a press conference for the Greek media, the director was asked about the critics for his film and replied that "the directors are not chosen by the critics or by the audience but by the time" and that for him all of his films are chapters of the same films, "Chapters, as he said, of a big book, about human destiny, about the times passed and about the times coming".

References

External links
 
 
 

2008 films
English-language Greek films
Films directed by Theodoros Angelopoulos
Films scored by Eleni Karaindrou
Films set in Greece
Films shot in Cologne
Films shot in Berlin
Films shot in Nizhny Novgorod
2008 drama films
Greek drama films
2000s English-language films